The Battle of Batin took place on 9 September 1810 near the small town of Batin, north Bulgaria during the Russo-Turkish War of 1806 to 1812. The conflict involved an attack by Russian forces on a defensive position held by a numerically stronger Ottoman Turk force. The outcome was a Russian victory which enabled their ongoing Balkan campaign to proceed unhindered.

Background
The Russo-Turkish wars had been taking place intermittently throughout the second half of the 1700s, interrupted latterly by pressure from Napoleon. In 1810 hostilities were resumed, and the Russians put Count Nikolay Kamensky in command of the Army of the Danube with orders to drive the Ottoman Turks out of the Balkan peninsula.

In June Kamensky crossed the Danube into northern Bulgaria. In August he sent part of his force under General Löwis to capture the town of Razgrad to protect his flank while he besieged the strongly fortified town of Shumen. There he suffered a setback when the Turks counter-attacked, not helped by the fact that Löwis's troops took a wrong road on their return. He therefore left his brother Sergei Kamensky with 30,000 men to control Shumen and led the rest of his army to attack the more important Danubian port of Rustchuk (now Ruse). In the meantime the Ottoman Turks had amassed a strong force in western Bulgaria and were advancing towards them along the south bank of the Danube.

Battle of Batin
In early August the advancing Turkish led army, some 40,000 strong, clashed with Russian troops under General Ouvarov who had been sent to delay them. Ouvarov retreated before them but to his surprise the Turks halted their advance and dug in. Kamensky contacted his brother at Shumen and ordered him to meet him at Batin with 10,000 of his men and, having left a force to guard Rustchuk, set off with 10,000 of his own men to the rendezvous.

The fighting commenced in earnest on 9 September 1810. Kamensky's men formed columns and made a frontal attack up a slope on the Turkish camp. When the attack stalled Kamensky sent his cavalry round the enemy's right flank to attack the Turkish position from the rear. His brother Sergei had meanwhile slipped round their left flank with his cavalry and also attacked from behind. The confusion allowed the frontal attack to press home causing the Turkish morale to break and many Turks to flee. The camp, its commander and artillery pieces were captured. However Muchtar Pasha, son of the infamous Ali Pasha of Ioannina, managed to escape unharmed with some 4,000 Albanian cavalry.

Aftermath
The Russians had lost some 1,500 men but the Turks had lost 5,000 killed, had 5,000 taken prisoner and suffered the scattering of their army. Kamensky was free to return to Rustchuk to complete the siege and capture of the town. However he was taken irrecoverably ill in February 1811, dying in May, and was temporarily succeeded by Count Louis Alexandre Andrault de Langeron.

References

Russo-Turkish wars
Conflicts in 1810
1810 in the Ottoman Empire
Ruse Province
19th century in Bulgaria
September 1810 events